Licochalcone A is a chalconoid, a type of natural phenol. It can be isolated from the root of Glycyrrhiza glabra (liquorice) or Glycyrrhiza inflata. It shows antimalarial, anticancer, antibacterial and antiviral (specifically against influenza neuraminidase) properties in vitro.

References 

Chalconoids